Czyżowice  is a village in the administrative district of Gmina Prudnik, within Prudnik County, Opole Voivodeship, in south-western Poland, close to the Czech border.

The village has a population of 300.

Monuments 
The following monuments are listed by the Narodowy Instytut Dziedzictwa.

 kaplica, z 1846 r.
 chapel from 1846
 folwark, z poł. XIX w. (dom, spichlerz)
 Historic homestead from the 19th century

References

Villages in Prudnik County